Hanna–Barbera's World of Super Adventure is a 30-minute animated anthology wheel series produced by Hanna-Barbera which was broadcast in first-run syndication from 1978 to 1984.

Overview
The series was similar in scope to Hanna-Barbera's 1977–78 syndicated rerun anthology, Fred Flintstone and Friends. It was packaged together by Hanna-Barbera and featured a combination of the following seven Hanna-Barbera action-adventure Saturday morning cartoons that were originally broadcast by various networks:
 Birdman and the Galaxy Trio (1967–1969)
 Fantastic Four (1967–1970)
 Frankenstein Jr. and The Impossibles (1966–1968)
 The Herculoids (1967–1968)
 Moby Dick and Mighty Mightor (1967–1968)
 Shazzan (1967–1969)
 Space Ghost and Dino Boy (1966–1968)

Revivals
Space Stars was a new updated version of this packaged series that ran on NBC from 1981–1982 which showcased new episodes of Space Ghost and The Herculoids, as well as the new shows Teen Force and Astro and the Space Mutts. It never reached the level of popularity as Super Adventures and was canceled after only one season.

The series was again repackaged in October 1992 as Super Adventures, when it was included in the debut schedule of the newly launched Cartoon Network, and featured an updated with a new intro and modified lineup. It contained the additional episodes featured in Space Stars. Finally, it added the thirteen The Thing segments from Fred and Barney Meet the Thing, the first seven episodes of Space Ace, Jonny Quest, Valley of the Dinosaurs, The Centurions, Mighty Man and Yukk, Godzilla, Thundarr the Barbarian and G-Force: Guardians of Space. It ran half-hour and two-hour shows on weekdays and weekends from October 1992 to July 1997. Spinoffs of the Super Adventures block included Power Zone (January 1995 as a weekend block, March 1996 as a weekday block) and Afternoon Adventures (September 1995).

Eventually, the Super Adventures franchise would be replaced with the legendary action block Toonami, which showed Space Ghost, Birdman, and Mighty Mightor as part of the Cartoon Roulette in their early years.

In the spring of 2000, Cartoon Network transferred the series to its sister channel Boomerang, now renamed "Boomeraction." The format was retooled yet again, this time as a varied hour show (it could run all day, for example.) It also added Arabian Knights, The New Adventures of Huck Finn, Super Friends, The Super Globetrotters, The Three Musketeers, and Rickety Rocket.

Opening narration
The opening title narration for the original 1978 broadcast was provided by Stanley Jones and consisted of the following message:

See also
 Fred Flintstone and Friends, another syndicated rerun anthology from Hanna-Barbera
 USA Cartoon Express, a cartoon block featuring many of these series

External links
 Hanna-Barbera's World of Super Adventure at The Big Cartoon DataBase

1979 American television series debuts
1984 American television series endings
1970s American animated television series
1980s American animated television series
1970s American anthology television series
1980s American anthology television series
American animated television spin-offs
American children's animated anthology television series
American children's animated science fantasy television series
American children's animated superhero television series
English-language television shows
First-run syndicated television programs in the United States
Hanna-Barbera superheroes
Space Ghost
Fantastic Four television series
Works based on Moby-Dick
Television series by Hanna-Barbera